Karen Jane Wallace (born 25 September 1971), known professionally as Jessie Wallace, is an English actress. She is known for portraying the role of Kat Slater on the BBC soap opera EastEnders since 2000. Her role as Kat won her the National Television Awards for Most Popular Newcomer (2001), as well as the British Soap Award for Best Newcomer (2001), Most Popular Actress (2003) and the British Soap Award for Best Actress (2011). She was also nominated for the 2011 BAFTA TV Award for Best Supporting Actress for her role as Pat Phoenix in the BBC Four television film The Road to Coronation Street.

Early life
Wallace was born in Enfield, North London, to James, a telecommunications engineer, and Annette, a secretary. Wallace is of Irish ancestry, by way of Cork and Dublin. Her parents divorced when she was aged three and she and her sister were raised by their father (however, she did see her mother at weekends). She adopted her stage name after her late grandmother.

Career
After schooling, Wallace trained as a make-up artist at the College of North East London in Tottenham and worked at the Royal Shakespeare Company for two years. She met and became friends with actor Iain Glen, who helped her apply for London drama college The Poor School, from which she graduated in 1999. While undertaking auditions – including for Andrew Lloyd Webber's Sunset Boulevard, she worked as a barmaid at her local pub, The Royal Oak in Loughton, Essex. Her first television appearance was in an episode of the ITV police drama series The Bill in 1999.

Wallace is known for playing the role of Kat Slater in BBC One soap opera EastEnders between 2000 and 2005. In Summer 2008, Wallace said she hadn't ruled out a return to EastEnders. In February 2010, it was announced that Shane Richie was returning to play Alfie Moon, leading to large amounts of speculation as to whether Wallace would also be returning. On 9 February 2010, the BBC confirmed that Jessie would be returning to EastEnders, reprising her role as Kat Slater. She and Alfie returned to screens in the Autumn of 2010. On 4 April 2015, the BBC announced that Wallace and Richie will depart from the show temporarily to appear in a six-part BBC One drama series, Redwater. In the series, Kat and Alfie will visit Ireland in the "search for answers to some very big questions". Speaking about the show, Wallace commented: "I have always loved working on EastEnders so when I heard of this new drama to take Kat and Alfie outside of Walford, I couldn’t believe our luck. To be exploring the next chapter for Kat as well as working alongside my best mate, Shane, is a dream come true and a huge compliment." However, Wallace and Richie revealed on This Morning on 20 January 2016 that Kat and Alfie will not be returning to EastEnders after the six-part drama. In December 2017 it was announced that Wallace would reprise the role of Kat from Spring 2018.

During her break from EastEnders, Wallace made television guest appearances, including once as Kat Slater, in the 2005 French & Saunders Christmas special. On 17 February 2006, Wallace was the guest host of an edition of the Channel 4 programme The Friday Night Project. In 2007, she appeared in the one-off BBC One television dramas A Class Apart opposite Nathaniel Parker, and The Dinner Party with Lee Evans and Alison Steadman. After visiting Hat Trick Productions with her agent, and singing an impromptu version of Marie Lloyd's song "The Boy I Love is Up in the Gallery", she was offered the lead role in Miss Marie Lloyd – Queen of The Music Hall for BBC Four.

Wallace made her West End theatre debut, replacing Denise van Outen in the role of "Maureen" in Rent remixed at the Duke of York's Theatre from 27 December 2007 until 2 February 2008. Wallace played Amy Kriel in the third series of ITV's Wild at Heart, and starred in a run of the play Haunted at the Arts Theatre from 24 May.

Wallace competed with partner Darren Bennett in the sixth series of Strictly Come Dancing which began on 20 September 2008. She was eliminated in week 4.

Wallace toured the UK in the 25th Anniversary production of Stepping Out by Richard Harris, playing the role of Sylvia.

Wallace appeared as Pat Phoenix in The Road to Coronation Street, a one-off drama exploring the origins and conception of Coronation Street, to mark the show's 50th anniversary in December 2010.

In 2014, Wallace reprised her role as Marie Lloyd in the music video for Tim Arnold's single "The Piccadilly Trot". She later appeared on Arnold's album The Soho Hobo on a duet that he wrote called "Soho Sunset".

In May 2015, Wallace performed a duet at Soho Theatre with singer-songwriter Tim Arnold to mark the release of his album The Soho Hobo. The song marks her first recording on a pop album and was written especially for her by Arnold.

In 2015, Wallace was cast as Fairy Godmother in the White Rock Theatre production of Cinderella.

Wallace is a patron of the theatre charity The Music Hall Guild of Great Britain and America.

In July 2015 it was announced that Wallace would appear alongside Richie in a stage adaptation of The Perfect Murder by Peter James at the Theatre Royal in February 2016.

Personal life
After coming to fame in EastEnders, her personal life became the focus of many tabloid newspapers. She entered the soap cast in the later stages of a three-year relationship with Majorca based ex-criminal, Paul Whitworth. After being warned by BBC executives, she split with Whitworth, and had a holiday romance with 25-year-old American, Andy Burton, who immediately sold his story.

In 2003, Wallace was suspended from EastEnders by the BBC for excess drinking, partying and adverse publicity; she returned to the soap, but was then stopped by police and arrested for drink driving, being one and half times over the limit. The BBC offered her counselling and while attending county court for sentencing, she was accompanied by a policeman, Dave Morgan, in case she was accosted by fans. The couple started dating, and then moved in together after Wallace confirmed she was pregnant. Wallace gave birth to daughter Tallulah Lilac on 2 November 2004, but the couple split up shortly afterwards, with Wallace's lawyers placing a gag order on Morgan.

In a later tabloid story in late 2007, whilst Wallace was filming Wild at Heart in Johannesburg with her cousin Jonathan and daughter Tallulah, her best friend, Stefan, suggested she still regularly took ketamine. Wallace admitted, at one point, taking drugs, but denied taking them since the birth of her daughter.

In early 2020, Wallace was suspended from EastEnders again by the BBC, with a two-month suspension incurred due to an "incident while filming".

In June 2022, Wallace was arrested after she assaulted a police officer outside a nightclub in Bury St Edmunds. She was released without charge but received a conditional caution. In response, Wallace was issued a warning for "unacceptable behaviour" by EastEnders bosses.

Filmography

Awards and nominations

References

External links
 
 

1971 births
Living people
Actresses from London
English musical theatre actresses
English soap opera actresses
English stage actresses
English television actresses
English people of Irish descent
People from Enfield, London
Royal Shakespeare Company members
Alumni of The College of Haringey, Enfield and North East London